The sixth series of the British medical drama television series Holby City commenced airing in the United Kingdom on BBC One on 7 October 2003, and concluded on 12 October 2004.

Reception
The British Medical Association denounced a January 2004 episode of the series which portrayed organ donation being carried out despite withdrawal of consent by the patient's relatives. Dr. Michael Wilks, chairman of the Medical Ethics Committee stated: "This simply would not happen, but its portrayal, even in a drama, is totally irresponsible and risks causing huge damage to the already struggling transplant programme."

Cast

Main characters 

Kelly Adams as Mickie Hendrie (from episode 24)
Ian Aspinall as Mubbs Hussein
Luisa Bradshaw-White as Lisa Fox
Tina Hobley as Chrissie Williams
Noah Huntley as Will Curtis (from episode 29)
Jaye Jacobs as Donna Jackson (from episode 24)
Verona Joseph as Jess Griffin

Art Malik as Zubin Khan

Rocky Marshall as Ed Keating (until episode 33)
Sharon Maughan as Tricia Williams

Mark Moraghan as Owen Davis
Jan Pearson as Kath Fox (until episode 26)
Patricia Potter as Diane Lloyd
Hugh Quarshie as Ric Griffin
Kim Vithana as Rosie Sattar

Recurring characters 
David Bedella as Carlos Fashola (from episode 42)
Liam Garrigan as Nic Yorke (until episode 13)
Rachel Leskovac as Kelly Yorke (until episode 17)
Andrew Lewis as Paul Rose

Episodes

References

06
2003 British television seasons
2004 British television seasons